If You Believe is a 1999 American television film that aired on Lifetime Television and stars Ally Walker, Hayden Panettiere and Tom Amandes. In the film, a Scrooge-like woman is visited by her "inner child," who helps her rediscover a zest for life. The film is a Spring Creek Production in association with Hearst Entertainment.

Plot
Once-successful book editor Susan Stone who would choose to go to work on Thanksgiving weekend, suddenly gets a visit from her inner child in the form of a seven-year-old girl, Suzie, whom only she can see and hear.

The inner child who does not want to go away until Susan is happy, keeps commenting on the merits of a potential love interest and teaches her how to playfully dance in her living room.

Cast
 Ally Walker as Susan Stone
 Hayden Panettiere as Young Susan "Suzie" Stone and Alice Stone, Susan's niece
 Tom Amandes as Thom Weller
 Meredith McGeachie as Robin
 Andrew Tarbet as Bob Stone
 Jonathan Welsh as Dylan Lewis

Nominations
 2000 – Hayden Panettiere nominated for Young Artist Award in category of Best Performance in a TV Movie or Pilot for Young Actress Age Ten or Under
 2001 – Anthea Sylbert and Richard Romanus nominated for WGA Award for Original Long Form

See also 
 List of Christmas films

References
 List of programs broadcast by Lifetime

External links
 
 
Variety.com review

1999 films
1999 television films
American Christmas drama films
Films scored by Stanley Clarke
Lifetime (TV network) films
Christmas television films
1990s Christmas drama films
1999 drama films
Films directed by Alan Metzger
American drama television films
1990s English-language films
1990s American films